Pierre Edmond Boissier (25 May 1810 Geneva – 25 September 1885 Valeyres-sous-Rances) was a Swiss prominent botanist, explorer and mathematician. 
He was the son of Jacques Boissier (1784-1857) and Caroline Butini (1786-1836), daughter of Pierre Butini (1759-1838) a well-known physician and naturalist from Geneva. With his sister, Valérie Boissier (1813-1894), he received a strict education with lessons delivered in Italian and Latin. Edmond's interest in natural history stemmed from holidays in the company of his mother and his grandfather, Pierre Butini at Valeyres-sous-Rances. His hikes in the Jura and the Alps laid the foundation of his zest for later exploration and adventure.  He attended a course at the Academy of Geneva given by Augustin Pyramus de Candolle.

Edmond Boissier collected extensively in Europe, North Africa and western Asia, on occasion accompanied by his daughter, Caroline Barbey-Boissier (1847-1918) and her husband, William Barbey (1842-1914), who collected in their own right for their Herbier Barbey-Boissier in Geneva. Edmond Boissier covered countries such as France, Greece, Italy, Norway, Portugal, Spain, Balearic Islands, Switzerland, Algeria, Egypt, Libya, Armenia, Palestine, Jordan, Lebanon, Syria and Turkey. His specimens are held at the following herbaria: AK, AWH, B, BERN, BM, BORD, BP, BR, C, CAS, CGE, CN, DBN, E, E-GL, F, FABR, FI, FR, G, GE, GH, GOET, H, HAL, JE, K, KIEL, L, LAU, LE, LY, LZ, M, MA, MANCH, MEL, MICH, MO, MPU, OXF, P, P-CO, PH, PI, STR, TCD, TO, W, WAG, WB (see List of herbaria).

He was the first to describe Allochrusa, Sclerocephalus, Jancaea, Prolongoa, Psychrogeton, Heteroderis, Myopordon, Aphanopleura, Ammiopsis, Crenosciadium, Diplotaenia, Ducrosia, Margotia, Lisaea, Ormosciadium, Polylophium, Microsciadium, Rhabdosciadium, Smyrniopsis, Stenotaenia, Thecocarpus, Trigonosciadium, Rhizocephalus, Coluteocarpus, Diceratella, Didymophysa, Eremobium, Graellsia, Heldreichia, Nasturtiopsis, Parlatoria, Physoptychis, Tchihatchewia, Paracaryum, Podonosma, Dorycnopsis, Erophaca, Acantholimon, Goniolimon and many more plant genera and taxa.

Standard author abbreviation

List of selected publications

Eponymy 
 The plant genera, Boissiera and also Petroedmondia (the family Apiaceae), are named in his honour.
 He is honoured in the plant taxa of; Asperula boissieri, Carthamus boissieri, Colchicum boissieri, Cordia boissieri, Convolvulus boissieri, Euphorbia boissieri, Haplophyllum boissieranum, Iris boissieri, Pyrus boissieriana, Thymus boissieri, Trifolium boissieri and Verbascum boissieri.
 As well as; the bacterium Acinetobacter boissieri, the air-breathing land snails Sphincterochila boissieri, Aceria boissieri ( gall mites) and the freshwater snail Bithynia boissieri are some of the animal species named after him.
 Boissiera is the title of a collection of systematic botany memoirs published by the Conservatoire et Jardin Botaniques de la Ville de Genève (CJB).

References

External links
 
Historical Orchid Literature
Essay on Boissier

Botanists with author abbreviations
19th-century Italian botanists
1810 births
1885 deaths
Taxon authorities of Hypericum species
Scientists from Geneva
Members of the Hungarian Academy of Sciences
Members of the Russian Academy of Sciences
Natural history of Palestine (region)
Members of the Göttingen Academy of Sciences and Humanities